Mai dire mai is the third album from Italian singer Anna Tatangelo. In this album, Tatangelo debuts as co-writer in "Averti qui" and "Lo so che finirà".

Track listing

Re-release track listing

Singles
 "Averti qui" (2007)
 "Lo so che finirà" (2007)
 "Il mio amico" (2008)
 "Sono fatta così" (2008)
 "Mai dire mai" (2008)

2007 albums
Anna Tatangelo albums